The Indian Institute of Soil Science (acronym IISS) is an autonomous institute for higher learning, established under the umbrella of Indian Council of Agricultural Research (ICAR) by the Ministry of Agriculture, Government of India for advanced research in the field of soil sciences.

Profile 

The Indian Institute of Soil Science (IISS) was established in 1988, as an Indian Council of Agricultural Research subsidiary at the lake city of Bhopal, in Madhya Pradesh, India with an aim to promote scientific research on soil sciences. The Institute covers All India Coordinated Research Project (AICRP) on Soil Test Crop Response Studies at 17 centres, All India Coordinated Research Project (AICRP) on Micronutrients and All India Network Project on Biofertilizers at 11 centres each in India.

IISS provides training and research facilities on subjects such as Soil testing, Techniques for improving nutrient and water efficiency, Carbon sequestration and Soil quality assessment.

The Institute is equipped with facilities such as air conditioned conference hall, committee room, lecture theatres, audio-visual aids, laboratory facilities, library and guest house of international standards and maintains a research farm extending to 50 hectares.

Mandate
The Institute is mandated to Provide Scientific Basis for Enhancing and Sustaining Productivity of Soil Resource with Minimal Environmental Degradation and the primary objectives are set as:

 Conduct of basic and advanced research on soil with regard to its physical, chemical and biological processes for efficient management of nutrients, water and energy.
 Identification of efficient and environment friendly soil management technologies.
 Assisting other research organizations in India on agriculture, forestry, fishery and environmental researches.
 Information exchange through various modes of information dissemination and collaboration with State Agricultural Universities and National and International Research Organizations.
 Development of database on soil science.

Divisions
The Institute has been divided into six divisions, each taking care of an independent area of activity.

Soil Physics
Soil Physics division oversees the research activities with regard to enhancement and sustaining of soil quality and productivity and conduct studies on conservation tillage, interaction of water and nutrients, crop diversification, rain-water harvesting and moisture conservation, simulation models for water and nutrient transmission and uptake, management of soil physical properties, soil aggregation dynamics and soil organic carbon conservation and sequestration according to climatic changes. The division maintains a modern laboratory equipped with pressure plate apparatus, sand box, neutron moisture meter, depth density gauge, Guelph permeameter, K-permeameter, rainfall simulator, wet sieving apparatus, root scanner and image analysis system, automatic runoff recorder and sediment collection and automatic weather station.

Soil Chemistry and Fertility
SCF division attends to strategic research on characterization of dominant chemical equilibria in major benchmark soils, nutrient dynamics and solid phases controlling nutrient availability. The emphasis is given for the:
 development of IPNS modules for balanced and conjunctive use of various sources of nutrient supply in the regional perspective
 improvement of the efficiency of applied nutrient inputs
 improvement and maintenance of carbon stocks in soils
 development of nutrient models to aid nutrient management decisions for important agro-ecosystems
 assessment of soil qualities to monitor long term changes in soil fertility under different agro-ecological systems
 build up models for prediction of changes in soil health.

Equipment such as UV Visible Spectraphotometer, Deep Freezer, Sonicator, kjeltech system, microwave digestion unit, autotitrator, flame photometer, Muffle furnace and nephelometer are available at the divisional laboratory.

Soil Biology
The activity spectrum of the Soil Botany division is to conduct on maintaining soil biodiversity in agro-ecosystem. Special emphasis is laid on research activities on:
 Soil biochemical attributes and produce quality indices
 development of technologies of recycling of various C:N ratio wastes
 assessment of soil quality parameters and quality of organic pools
 soil C/C sequestration under different agro systems
 characterization of functional communities of soil organisms and microbial biodiversities

Division maintains a laboratory with HPLC, GLC, laminar flow, BOD incubator, research microscope with camera and CCTV system, automatic media distributor, incubator shaker, muffle furnace, vacuum driver, water purification system, Gerhardt block digester and inoculation room.

Environmental Soil Science
The division is engaged in the creation and an upkeep of an uptodate database with regard to the soil pollution due to unfair use of fertilizers, city, industrial and agricultural wastes for crop production and for the development of suitable remedial technologies including recycling of wastes. It also assesses the sink capacity of soils for heavy metal pollutants and major environmental issues related to organic farming.

The laboratory of the division is equipped with Polarographic analyzer, Water analyzer, Soxlet apparatus, BOD and COD analyzer, Infra red gas analyzer (IRGA), Water potential system, TLC, Ion chromatograph, UV-visible spectrophotometer, N distillation system, Flame photometer and nephelometer.

Statistics and Computer Application Section
The research activities of the division is focussed on applied research on statistical techniques and computer applications in management of nutrients and water. Modern computer facilities and data analysis software like SPSS (10.0) are available with the division.

Agricultural Knowledge Management Unit (AKMU)
IISS hosts an Agricultural Knowledge Management Unit (AKMU) to provide communication facilities to the scientists and the institute, in general. A 75 node LAN and an own email server are in place, operated with the assistance of institute owned VSAT. The web site of the institute is also maintained by the AKMU.

Facilities

Library, Information and Documentation services
The Institute maintains a library which stocks 1805 books, 1281 Bound Journals, 661 Annual Reports, 28 Foreign Journals, and 43 Indian  Journals. It provides document lending, reference and reprographic Services and has AGRIS database of the Food and Agriculture Organization of the United Nations.

Training and Referral Soil Testing Laboratory
TRSL laboratory assist the scientists to explore novel methods for soil and plant analysis and is equipped with soil and plant analysis equipment such as distillation unit, spectrophotometer, flame photometer and precision balance.

The other facilities include two screen houses for the conduct of pot experiments, conference hall and conference room fitted with audio visual equipment, training hostel, staff recreation club and indoor and outdoor games facilities.

Research Projects
IISS undertakes research projects under All India Coordinator Research Projects (AICRP), some of which are:

Long-Term Fertilizer Experiments (LTFE) Project: Project on the impact of chemical fertilizer on productivity and soil quality. The project was inaugurated in 1970 and is carried out at 11 centres. The project is now known as Long-term fertilizer experiments to study changes in soil quality, crop productivity and sustainability after its mandate was expanded.

Soil Test Crop Response (STCR) Project : The beginning of the project was in 1967 and 13 centres are participating in the project.

PCM Project: The purpose of the project was to study the effects of micronutrient efficiency on various crop varieties and was started in 1967, with active participation from Punjab Agricultural University, Ludhiana. Eleven centres are participating in the project.

AINPB Project: The mandate of the project is set as:
 To exploit the soil biodiversity in various agro-ecologies for biofertilizer applications in diverse cropping systems.
 To study the impact of soil management practices on functional diversity of microorganisms involved in key microbial functions and soil health using genomic tools.
 Formulation and testing of mixed biofertilizers in diverse cropping systems.
 To improve biofertilizer technology with particular reference to quality, carriers, consortia and delivery systems.
 To diversify biofertilizer research and application in drylands, mountainous regions, tribal areas and other underexplored ecosystems.
 Research-Adoption-Impact continuum analysis of Biofertilizer usage

Publications
 
 
 
 
 
 
 
 
 
 
 
 
 
 
 
 
 
 
IISS has published many more books and research papers.

See also

 Agriculture
 Agroecological restoration
 Agroecosystem
 Agroecosystem analysis
 Agronomy
 Agrophysics
 Biodynamic agriculture
 Dynamic equilibrium
 Ecology
 Integrated Pest Management
 Organic agriculture
 Rural Sociology
 Soil Science

References

External links
 on Wikimapia
 Profile as a handout
 Reference on Academia Edu
 Reference on ASTI
 Exchange visit

Agroecology
Agricultural research institutes in India
Soil science in India
Research institutes in Madhya Pradesh
Research institutes established in 1988
1988 establishments in Madhya Pradesh